Noel Jones (born January 31, 1950) is a Jamaican minister and a Pentecostal bishop. He is the senior pastor of the City of Refuge Church in Gardena, California, which has about 17,000 members, and was formerly the Greater Bethany Community Church.

Early life
Jones was born in Spanish Town, Jamaica on January 31, 1950. One of seven children born to Bishop Robert (who was a politician and Apostolic clergyman) and Marjorie Jones. He was raised alongside a diverse array of siblings (one of whom is the actress and singer Grace Jones). His parents took him and his two siblings at the time, Chris and Grace, and relocated to Syracuse, New York in 1965.

Early education and ministry

Jones received the call to ministry at the age of 19. He attended St. Jago High School and went on to attain a Bachelor of Science in Theology degree from Aenon Bible College. He would later receive an honorary doctoral degree from the International Circle of Faith College (Now, Life College and Seminary) . At the age of 26, he accepted his first pastorate at Bethel Temple of Longview in Longview, Texas.

Current ministry

In June 1994, Jones was chosen to succeed Bishop Robert W. McMurray as pastor to approximately 1,000 members of the Greater Bethany Community Church, located at 84th & Hoover Street in South Los Angeles, California. During his tenure, the membership of the church has increased so significantly that, in 2003, a new building was acquired in Gardena, California. The new sanctuary, now known as "The City of Refuge", accommodates a growing membership of 17,000. The church has a choir known as the City of Refuge Sanctuary Choir. Their 2007 debut album, Welcome to the City, charted on the Billboard 200 chart and made number one on the Billboard Top Gospel Albums chart.

Documentary film 
English film director and producer Sophie Fiennes in 2002 made a documentary film about the Greater Bethany Community Church with the title Hoover Street Revival.

References

External links
 

1950 births
Living people
American bishops
Jamaican emigrants to the United States
Oneness Pentecostalism
Religious leaders from Syracuse, New York
Protestant bishops
Oneness Pentecostals
People from Spanish Town